Confetti is a 1927 British silent drama film directed by Graham Cutts and starring Jack Buchanan, Annette Benson and Sydney Fairbrother. It had its trade show in December 1927. The film was shot at Gainsborough Pictures' Islington studios.

Cast
 Jack Buchanan as Count Andrea Zorro
 Annette Benson as Dolores
 Sydney Fairbrother as Duchess Maxine
 Robin Irvine as Carlo
 Andrée Sacré as Roxanne
 Georges Térof as Confetti Manufacturer

References

Bibliography
 Rachel Low, The History of British Film: Volume IV, 1918–1929 (Routledge, 1997)

External links

1927 films
1927 drama films
Films directed by Graham Cutts
British drama films
British silent feature films
Islington Studios films
Films set in Nice
British black-and-white films
Films shot at British International Pictures Studios
1920s English-language films
1920s British films
Silent drama films